Still Over It is the second studio album by American singer and songwriter Summer Walker. It was released through LVRN and Interscope on November 5, 2021. The album contains guest appearances from Cardi B, JT from City Girls, SZA, Ari Lennox, Lil Durk, Pharrell Williams, Omarion, and Ciara. On the two-year anniversary of their debut studio album, Walker announced the release of Still Over It through a video teaser.

A direct follow-up to Walker's debut album, Over It (2019), Still Over It is considered a "story," exploring Walker's tumultuous relationship with producer London on da Track before, during, and after their pregnancy. Each song is aligned to a timeline starting from August 4, 2019 to October 7, 2021. The album shares a contemporary R&B appeal with 2000s R&B, neo soul, and trap elements throughout.

Upon release, Still Over It garnered widespread acclaim from music critics and appeared on numerous year-end lists. Critics particularly commended the album's cohesiveness and introspective lyrics and deemed it Walker's best album to date. Also a commercial success, the album broke the record for most album streams in a single day by a female artist on Apple Music. It debuted atop the US Billboard 200, becoming Walker's first number-one album, and the highest charting album from a female R&B artist since Beyoncé's Lemonade (2016). The lead single "Ex for a Reason" featuring JT from City Girls was released on October 15, 2021.

Background and recording
Following the release of Over It, Walker released their EP, Life on Earth on July 20, 2020, and surprised fans after announcing their pregnancy with then-boyfriend and executive producer of Over It, London on da Track. After giving birth to their daughter in March 2021, the singer hinted at new music on their social media platforms. In June, Walker shared photos in the studio with artists Omarion, SZA, and producer Pharrell Williams. In early October, Walker intended on appearing at the 2021 BET Hip Hop Awards' red carpet to announce their second album. However, due to COVID-19 restrictions (which Walker had been vocal about two months earlier), they were uninvited. Therefore, they shared the album announcement on social media, revealing the details outside on a projector.

Concept
Still Over It is a sequel, or direct follow-up, to Walker's Over It in 2019. Prior to Walker's publicized break-up with producer London on da Track and giving birth to their daughter, Walker became the face of social media controversy regarding their relationship. According to Walker, the album is considered a "story". The singer revealed the album's tracklist which is organized as a timeline, with its 20 tracks starting from August 4, 2019, to October 7, 2021. The dates hint at when the songs were either written, recorded, or developed, but symbolically represent the timeline after the success of Walker's debut album.

DeAsia Page of Pitchfork described Still Over It as a "journey through a messy and complicated breakup", which is directly based on Walker's relationship with the producer. According to an exclusive message Walker provided for Apple Music, Walker described the album as a reflection of their mistakes. Walker writes, "You don't have to guess if something is love. Love is shown through actions. Stop making excuses for people who don't show up for you. Don't ignore the red flags. And don't think you have to stay somewhere 'cause you can't find better—you can and you will. Don't settle for less—you don't deserve it and neither does your family."

Cover artworks
On October 25, Walker revealed two official album covers on their social media platforms. The main artwork, which is for the physical release, displays the artist holding their daughter while on the phone in the kitchen. The digital artwork features Walker in a car with their hand towards the camera, fending off paparazzi. The physical artwork was photographed by Deun Ivory, while the digital artwork was taken by photographer Rolex, who notably shot the artwork for their 2020 EP, Life on Earth and singer Bryson Tiller's third album Anniversary.

Music and lyrics

Still Over It opens with a "hazy stream of consciousness" as the track "Bitter" addresses Walker's social media feuds with the mothers of producer London on da Track's children, which they had addressed on their platforms months prior. At the end of the song, Cardi B expresses her support of Walker, encouraging them to address their pregnancy in their music. The album transitions into the second track and lead single "Ex for a Reason", an uptempo 2000s-inspired R&B track produced by Sean Garrett. The song conveys "emotions behind dating someone that's moved on from a past relationship."

On the third track "No Love", Walker and SZA declare emotional detachment in favor of sexual gratification. The fourth track "Throw It Away" samples Keke Wyatt and Avant's song "Nothing in This World" as Walker mourns about a broken relationship. "Reciprocate" and "You Don't Know Me" both tackle the need for communication as their lover does the "bare minimum" to keep the relationship going. "Circus" and "Insane" are both neo soul tracks about efforts in keeping a complicated relationship together, although it affects their mentally.

"Constant Bullshit" is another 2000s R&B-influenced track with layered harmonies reminiscent of singer Brandy. The song, along with "Switch a Nigga Out" continue the singer's grief of a fallen relationship, admitting their own flaws within it. "Unloyal" is a neo soul song with singer Ari Lennox and a saxophone solo, bringing both artists to a breaking point with their past lovers. Before the album's release, Walker revealed "Unloyal" is their favorite song on the album and commended Lennox's contributions to the track.

On the twelfth track "Closure", Walker sings about ending an unhealthy relationship over a nostalgic R&B beat. The song transitions into "Toxic" with rapper Lil Durk, a song about a complicated relationship that comes with benefits. The fourteenth track "Dat Right There" is a Neptunes-produced track, described as an upbeat, petty anthem similar to the second track, where Walker "emphasizes [their] sexual prowess" and boasts about taking other women's boyfriends. "Screwin" is a slow R&B track where Walker and Omarion exchange sexually explicit banter. "Broken Promises" is another slow track where the singer confronts their past lover for not living up to his standards. The seventeenth track "Session 33" is a follow-up to Walker's 2018 debut single "Session 32", as Walker confronts London on da Track for infidelity after their pregnancy. The nineteenth track "4th Baby Mama" starts with a sample of Profyle's "Liar", and Walker begins with "I wanna start with your mama, she should've whooped your ass" to address London on da Track's infidelity and lack of support for their pregnancy. The album closes with a narration from singer Ciara, delivering "an earnest appeal to Jesus to send her a deserving partner."

Release and promotion
On October 2, Walker shared a photo of a jewel-encrusted hard drive with "Album #2" taped on the bottom; the post's caption linked fans to a separate Instagram account (of the hard drive) further promoting the album. On October 4, the two-year anniversary of Over It, Walker released a teaser via social media, sharing a skit featuring themself and City Girls member, JT. The skit involves a phone conversation between Walker, in the same attire from their first album's artwork, and JT, who appears in jail (similar to 
the artist's incarceration around the time of the debut album's release). On October 17, Walker announced a challenge in select cities New York City, Chicago, and Atlanta, where fans can listen to the album early by attempting to break a glass case with the album's hard drive inside. The challenge has been featured heavily on TikTok.

The album was released on November 5, 2021, and available in both digital and physical formats, including a Target-exclusive, with an alternative black-and-white artwork and an additional a cappella bonus track of "Broken Promises". Also, Walker released limited copies of physically-written autographed CDs on their official website. After an instant sell-out, the singer released limited autographed copies in digital format, solely for fans who were not able to purchase an autographed CD. The digital version featured two bonus tracks: a cappella versions of "Circus" and "Constant Bullshit".

On November 8, Walker performed a solo version of "Unloyal" on The Tonight Show with Jimmy Fallon, making it their second appearance on the show and their first live performance promoting Still Over It. A day after, Walker performed songs from Still Over It as well as their past songs during a livestream performance exclusively for YouTube Premium subscribers. On November 28, Walker performed "Unloyal" alongside Ari Lennox at the 2021 Soul Train Music Awards, making it their second appearance at the annual ceremony after winning Best New Artist in 2019.

Critical reception

Still Over It was met with widespread acclaim upon release. At Metacritic, which assigns a normalized rating out of 100 to reviews from mainstream publications, the album received an average score of 85, based on eight reviews, indicating "universal acclaim".

Josh Abraham of Clash wrote the album "serves up Summer Walker's best work yet. It's brutal, yet romantic, it's fun, yet flirty, it's everything any listener could be wanting. A rollercoaster of emotions and [they're] not even finished yet." NMEs Kyann-Sian Williams stated that "Walker has a song here for every feeling following a crushing break-up, from confusion to anger to outright pettiness – and it's the kind of unwavering quality that we all love [them] for." Megan Jordan of Rolling Stone opined that "Musically, Over It nodded to R&B icons of the Nineties and early 2000s like 702 and Usher. Still Over It builds on that sound, with poppier moments like 'Dat Right There,' and 'Ex for a Reason,' which features a hard-hitting rap from JT of City Girls. The sultry 'No Love,' featuring SZA, is a sex anthem about the need to sometimes 'fuck, get drunk,' without the messy emotions that could come with attachment. The album moves smoothly and slowly on songs like 'You Don't Know Me,' the Ari Lennox feature 'Unloyal,' and the sexy ballad 'Screwin,' showcasing both Walker's multifaceted voice and the excellent range of duet partner Omarion." Luke Ballance of The Line of Best Fit said although the album is "Littered with a variety of appearances from A-listers like Cardi B, SZA and Ciara over the course of its twenty tracks, it still finds Walker front and centre, with [their] characteristically introspective lyrics feeling more gripping than ever."

Year-end lists

Commercial performance
Still Over It debuted at number one on the US Billboard 200 dated November 20, 2021, with 166,000 album-equivalent units, becoming Summer Walker's first number-one album and the first number-one R&B album by a woman since Beyoncé's Lemonade in 2016. It also had the biggest opening week of 2021 for an R&B album and the largest streaming figures for a female R&B album, with over 201.1 million streams of the album's tracks. The album broke the record for the most concurrent songs on the South African Music Chart, with all 20 songs debuting within the chart's top 100 in the week ending November 18, 2021.

Track listing

Notes
  indicates a co-producer
  indicates an additional producer
  "Throw It Away" interpolates "Nothing in This World", written by Steve 'Stone' Huff and performed by Keke Wyatt and Avant.
  "4th Baby Mama" contains a sample of "Liar", written by Roy Hamilton, Ernest Dixon, and Tyrell Bing, and performed by Profyle.
  "Ciara's Prayer" is only included on digital versions of the album.

Personnel
Musicians
 Summer Walker – vocals (all tracks), guitar (6, 17)
 Cardi B – narrator (1)
 JT – rap vocals (2)
 SZA – vocals (3)
 Ari Lennox – vocals (11)
 Lil Durk – vocals (13)
 Pharrell Williams – vocals (14)
 Omarion – vocals (15)
 Ciara – narrator (20)
 Sean Garrett – background vocals (1–5, 7, 9–10, 12–16), vocals (18)
 Nija Charles – additional vocals (2)
 The Neptunes – instrumental ensemble (14)

Technical
 Sean Garrett – vocal producer (3–5, 10, 12, 14, 16, 18)
 Colin Leonard – master engineering (all tracks)
 David "Dos Dias" Bishop – record engineering (1–18)
 Rob Bisel – record engineering (3)
 Mike Larson – record engineering (14)
 Morgan David – record engineering (14)
 MixedbyAli – mixer
 Cyrus "NOIS" Taghipour – mixer (2)
 Curtis "Sircut" Bye – assistant mixer

Charts

Weekly charts

Year-end charts

References

2021 albums
Summer Walker albums
Interscope Records albums
Albums produced by 9th Wonder
Albums produced by London on da Track
Albums produced by Sean Garrett
Albums produced by the Neptunes
Albums produced by Nineteen85
Sequel albums